Manufacturing in Australia peaked in the 1960s at 25% of the country's gross domestic product, and has since dropped below 10%.

History

The contribution of manufacturing to Australia's gross domestic product peaked in the 1960s at 25%, and had dropped to 13% by 2001–2 and 10.5% by 2005–6.
In 2004–05, the manufacturing industry exported products worth $67,400 million, and employed 1.1 million people.

In 2000–2001, $3.3 billion was spent on assistance to the manufacturing industry, with 40% going to the textile, clothing and footwear industry and the passenger motor vehicle industry. At that time, manufacturing accounted for 48% of exports, and 45% of Australian research and development.

In 2007, the breakdown of manufacturing by state, and the fraction of gross state product (GSP) which it contributed, were as follows:

Between 2001 and 2007, the approximate breakdown by industry changed as follows:

Food processing

The food and beverage manufacturing industry is the largest in Australia.  The sectors include the following:

* Before the 2010 closure of the Port Lincoln Tuna cannery

Textile industry
Until trade liberalisation in the mid 1980s, Australia had a large textile industry.  This decline continued through the first decade of the 21st century. Since the 1980s, tariffs have steadily been reduced; in early 2010, the tariffs were reduced from 17.5 percent to 10 percent on clothing, and 7.5–10% to 5% for footwear and other textiles.
As of 2010, most textile manufacturing, even by Australian companies, is performed in Asia.

Motor vehicles

As of 2008, four companies mass-produced cars in Australia. Mitsubishi ceased production in March 2008, followed by Ford in 2016, and Holden and Toyota in 2017.

Holden bodyworks were manufactured at Elizabeth, South Australia and engines were produced at the Fishermans Bend plant in Port Melbourne, Victoria. In 2006, Holden's export revenue was just under 1.3 billion. In March 2012, Holden was given a $270 million lifeline by the Australian government. In return, Holden planned to inject over $1 billion into car manufacturing in Australia. They estimated the new investment package would return around $4 billion to the Australian economy and see GM Holden continue making cars in Australia until at least 2022. However, Holden announced on 11 December 2013 that Holden cars would no longer be manufactured in Australia from the end of 2017.

Ford had two main factories, both in Victoria: located in the Geelong suburb of Norlane and the northern Melbourne suburb of Broadmeadows. Both plants were closed down in October 2016.

Until 2006, Toyota had factories in Port Melbourne and Altona, Victoria, after which all manufacturing was performed at Altona. In 2008, Toyota exported 101,668 vehicles worth $1,900 million. In 2011 the figures were "59,949 units worth $1,004 million". On 10 February 2014 it was announced that by the end of 2017 Toyota would cease manufacturing vehicles and engines in Australia.

In March 2012, a new Australian auto maker, Tomcar, announced they are to build a new factory in Melbourne.

Chemical industry

Australia has a chemical industry, including the manufacture of many petrochemicals.

Many mining companies, such as BHP and Comalco, perform initial processing of raw materials. Similarly, Australia's agriculture feeds into the chemical industry.  Tasmania produces 40% of the world's raw narcotic materials; some of this is locally converted into codeine and other pharmaceuticals in Tasmania by Tasmanian Alkaloids, owned by Johnson and Johnson, while GlaxoSmithKline processes some of the resulting poppy straw in Victoria.

Companies with manufacturing facilities in Australia
A partial list of companies operating manufacturing facilities in Australia, with their most important products.

Australian-owned

Consumer
ADINA Watches
Akubra
Bellroy
Citizen Wolf
Cole Clark
Cue
Driza-Bone
Evolution Boats
Fenech Guitars
Gilet Guitars
Hancock Guitars
Lester shoes
Malvern Star
Maton
Mrs Mac's Pies
Nippy's
Paspaley
Pental
Pratley Guitars
R. M. Williams
Riviera Australia
Røde Microphones
Rosella
Saxbys Soft Drinks
Sol Invictus Motorcycle Co.
Tharwa Valley Forge
Vegemite
Visy

Industrial
Amcor 
Arrium
BHP
BlueScope
Boral
Bradken
Breseight Group
Capral Aluminium
Clutch Industries
CSR
Dawn Tools
Downer Group
Ecocanopy
Forgacs Group
Gallard-Trewin Connectors
Heritage Saws
KC Tools
Incat
Mudex
Mumme Tools
Nexans Olex
Orica
Orora
Rio Tinto
Stratco
Sutton Tools
Timberlink (NewForests)
UGL Limited
Vesper Tools

International
Apex Tool Group
Australian Paper (Nippon Paper)
Buildex
Cadbury Chocolate
Cement Australia (Holcim)
Cyclone Tools
Electrolux (ovens)
Essentra Pty Ltd
Fletcher Building - Laminex Division
Ingredion
Iveco
Kenworth
Nissan Castings
Nyrstar
Owens Illinois
Rheem
Tindo
Volvo Trucks
WD-40 Company

Companies that no longer manufacture in Australia
Companies that closed down, or moved manufacturing offshore.

Australian Owned:
Pacific Brands Clothing
South Pacific Tyres (Ansell/Goodyear) Tyres

International:

Ford Australia
Holden (General Motors)
Sidchrome
Bridgestone
Mitsubishi Motors Australia
Nissan
Toyota Australia
Trojan Tools

See also

Australian Made
Ausbuy
Balance of payments of Australia
Economy of Australia
Jackson Committee, established in 1974 by the Whitlam government of Australia to advise on policies for Australia's manufacturing industry

References